Good & Plenty is a brand of licorice candy. The candy is a narrow cylinder of sweet black licorice, coated in a hard candy shell to form a capsule shape. The pieces are colored bright pink and white and presented in a purple box or bag.

History
Good & Plenty was first produced by the Quaker City Chocolate & Confectionery Company of Philadelphia, Pennsylvania in 1893 and is believed to be the oldest branded candy in the United States. A second candy, Good & Fruity, a multicolored, multi-flavor candy with a similar shape.

Warner-Lambert purchased Quaker City in 1973 and sold it to Leaf Candy Company (owned by Beatrice Foods) in 1982. It is now produced by Hershey Foods, which purchased Leaf North America in 1996.

Beginning around 1950, a cartoon character named "Choo-Choo Charlie" appeared in Good & Plenty television commercials. Choo-Choo Charlie was a boy pretending to be a railroad engineer. He would shake a box of the candy in his hand in a circular motion, imitating a train's pushrods and making a sound like a train. Advertising executive Russ Alben wrote the "Choo-Choo Charlie" jingle based on the popular song "The Ballad of Casey Jones".

See also 
Mukhwas
London drops, a similar candy sold in Finland and Sweden
Liquorice comfits
 List of confectionery brands

References

External links
 

 

Products introduced in 1893
The Hershey Company brands
Liquorice (confectionery)
American confectionery
Brand name confectionery